Stefano Casarotto (born 13 June 1996) is an Italian professional footballer who plays as midfielder for Mestre.

External links

References 

Living people
1996 births
People from Dolo
Italian footballers
Association football midfielders
A.C. Mestre players
Virtus Verona players
Sportspeople from the Metropolitan City of Venice
Footballers from Veneto